Sophronica fuscofasciata is a species of beetle in the family Cerambycidae. It was described by Lepesme and Stephan von Breuning in 1956.

References

Sophronica
Beetles described in 1956